Minervarya teraiensis (Terai cricket frog or Terai wart(y) frog) is a species of frog that is found in southern Nepal, adjacent Sikkim and northeastern India, and southeastern and central Bangladesh. It has recently been reported also from Bhutan. It is a common species associated with open grasslands, often found close to permanent pools and streams.

References

teraiensis
Amphibians of Bangladesh
Amphibians of Bhutan
Frogs of India
Amphibians of Nepal
Amphibians described in 1984
Taxobox binomials not recognized by IUCN